Aleksandrs Leimanis (17 October 1913, in the village Gabrilovo, Smolensk Governorate – 17 June 1990 in Riga) was a Latvian film director.

His film work spanned the Soviet period, during which he directed over 15 films, including the cult classics The Devil's Servants and the sequel The Devil's Servants in the Devil's Mill.

References

1913 births
1990 deaths
Latvian film directors
Soviet film directors
Burials at Forest Cemetery, Riga
Russian Academy of Theatre Arts alumni